Peace & Change: A Journal of Peace Research is a quarterly peer-reviewed academic journal covering peace studies published by Wiley-Blackwell for the Peace History Society and the Peace and Justice Studies Association. It was established in 1972 and the editor-in-chief is Heather Fryer (Creighton University).

Erwin Fahlbusch, in the Evangelisches Kirchenlexikon, describes it as one of "three prominent peace journals" which "are especially worthy of note".

Abstracting and indexing 
The journal is abstracted and indexed in:
 EBSCO databases 
 ProQuest databases
 RILM Abstracts of Music Literature

References

External links 

Peace and conflict studies
Wiley-Blackwell academic journals
International relations journals
Publications established in 1972
English-language journals
Quarterly journals